Belmont Park may refer to:

Australia
 Belmont Park Racecourse, a thoroughbred horse racing track in Burswood, Western Australia
 Belmont Park railway station, Perth, a closed train station near the Belmont Park Racecourse in Perth, Western Australia
 Belmont State Park, on Lake Macquarie in New South Wales

Canada
 Belmont Park, Colwood, a neighbourhood of Colwood, British Columbia
 Belmont Park, Montreal, a defunct amusement park in Montreal, Quebec
 Belmont Provincial Park on Prince Edward Island

New Zealand
 Belmont Regional Park in Hutt City

United Kingdom
 Belmont Park, Exeter, a public park provided by Exeter City Council
 Belmont Park, Sutton, southernmost part of the Shanklin Estate

United States
 Belmont Park, a thoroughbred horse race track in Elmont, New York
 Belmont Park station, a Long Island Railroad stop at the race track
 Belmont Park (San Diego), an amusement park in San Diego, California
 Belmont Lake State Park, a park in Babylon, Long Island, New York.

See also
 Belmont (disambiguation)